Rethera brandti, the lesser madder hawkmoth, is a moth of the family Sphingidae. The species was first described by Otto Bang-Haas in 1937. It is found from south-eastern Turkey and north-eastern Iraq to southern Iran along the Zagros Mountains and then into western Pakistan. It is also present in the Alborz and Kopet Dag Mountains of northern Iran. The habitat of ssp. brandti consists of sparsely vegetated slopes up to 2,000 meters, while the habitat of ssp. euteles consists of hilly steppe and desert-edge vegetation between 1,500 and 2,500 meters altitude.

The wingspan is 40–46 mm. Adults of ssp. brandti are on from April mid-May in one generation per year. Adults of ssp. euteles are on wing from late March to mid-May depending on the altitude in one or two generations per year.

The larvae probably feed on Galium species.

Subspecies
Rethera brandti brandti (Alborz and Kopet Dag Mountains of northern Iran)
Rethera brandti euteles Jordan, 1937 (south-eastern Turkey and north-eastern Iraq to southern Iran along the Zagros Mountains and then into western Pakistan)

References

Macroglossini
Moths described in 1937
Insects of Turkey